Alan Kendall Duncan (born 1965 in Shreveport) is an American physician who holds the position of Assistant Professor of Medicine at the Mayo Clinic College of Medicine in Rochester, Minnesota.  Duncan was born in Shreveport, Louisiana and was a member of the first graduating class of the Caddo Parish Magnet High School, a competitive entry school for the arts and academics.  After completing primary education, Duncan entered an accelerated six-year program at the Louisiana State University School of Medicine, leading to the Doctor of Medicine degree.

After medical school, Duncan completed internship and residency in internal medicine on the Osler Medical Service at the Johns Hopkins Hospital in Baltimore, Maryland.  He remained on-staff at Hopkins from 1992 to 1994 as clinical faculty, involved with in-patient and ambulatory resident education.  Duncan left Hopkins to accept a fellowship in Cardiovascular Diseases at the Mayo Clinic in 1994; then joined the staff of the Mayo Clinic in 1995.  At Mayo, he has held numerous positions including the vice chair for practice in the Division of General Internal Medicine.

Currently, Duncan serves as medical director of the SPARC Innovation Program.  This program, the first of its kind, brings contemporary design thinking into a medical services organization.  The program occupies a design studio embedded within a clinical practice to incorporate user-centered design into the improvement and creation and new health services.

References

External links
What patients want

1965 births
American cardiologists
Johns Hopkins Hospital physicians
Living people